Jackson Maríñez (born December 21, 1990) is a Dominican professional boxer who challenged for the WBA interim lightweight title in 2020.

Professional career

Maríñez vs. Romero 
Maríñez faced undefeated Rolando Romero for the vacant WBA interim lightweight title on August 15, 2020, at the Mohegan Sun Arena in Uncasville, Connecticut. Romero captured the vacant WBA interim title via twelve-round unanimous decision with the judges' scorecards reading 118–110, 116–112, 115–113 in his favor. This decision was considered very controversial, with many feeling Marinez deserved the win.

Maríñez vs. Commey 
In his next fight, he took on former IBF lightweight champion Richard Commey on February 13, 2021 in Paradise, Nevada. Maríñez suffered his second consecutive professional defeat, losing via sixth-round knockout.

Professional boxing record

References

External links

Living people
1990 births
Dominican Republic male boxers
Lightweight boxers
Sportspeople from Santo Domingo